Polevodka (Üstügi-Kübeye) is a rural locality (a settlement) in Ust-Koksinsky District, the Altai Republic, Russia. The population was 83 as of 2016. There are 3 streets.

Geography 
Polevodka is located 29 km southeast of Ust-Koksa (the district's administrative centre) by road. Margala is the nearest rural locality.

References 

Rural localities in Ust-Koksinsky District